In US broadcasting, service contour (or protected contour) refers to the area in which the Federal Communications Commission (FCC) predicts coverage.

The FCC calculates FM and TV contours based on effective radiated power (ERP) in a given direction, the radial height above average terrain (HAAT) in a given direction, the FCC's propagation curves, and the station's class.  AM contours are based on the standard ground wave field strength pattern, the frequency, and the ground conductivity in the area.  While the FCC makes FM and TV service contour data readily available, the  AM, while unavailable as a separate data file, can be obtained through an AM Query in the resulting 'maps' section of each record (when using the 'detailed output' output option).

External links 
 FM and TV Service Contour Data (Official)
 FM Database protected contour maps (Official)
 AM Station Query (Official)
 FM Station Query (Official)
 TV Station Query (Official)
 Plot predicted AM/FM coverage patterns (unofficial)

Broadcast engineering